Muriedas is the capital of the municipality of Camargo (Cantabria, Spain). 
The town is situated 7 kilometers from Santander. Within just 2 kilometers away is the Santander Airport, which is located in Maliaño, in the town of Camargo, as well as the bay and harbor.

References 

Populated places in Cantabria
Localities of Spain